Thomas Gray Walker (born 1964) was the United States Attorney for the Eastern District of North Carolina.

Early life and education
Walker was born in 1964 in Atlanta, Georgia.  Walker graduated from Baylor University (1986) and the Norman Adrian Wiggins School of Law at Campbell University (1990).

Career
At the time of his confirmation in 2011, Walker was a partner at Alston & Bird, LLP, where he had worked since 2003.  Prior to that, Walker worked as special counsel to North Carolina Attorney General Roy A. Cooper, from 2001 to 2003.  He also served as an Assistant United States Attorney for the Western District of North Carolina from 1994 to 2001 and an Assistant District Attorney for Mecklenburg County, North Carolina, from 1990 to 1994.

Walker announced his intention on December 22, 2015, to resign his post as United States Attorney for the Eastern District of North Carolina effective January 7, 2016.

References

External links
President Obama nominates four U.S. attorneys
WRAL: Senate confirms Walker as new US Attorney

1964 births
Living people
Baylor University alumni
Campbell University alumni
North Carolina Democrats
United States Attorneys for the Eastern District of North Carolina
People from Atlanta
20th-century American lawyers
21st-century American lawyers